KLCI (106.1 FM, "Total Country BOB-FM") is a radio station serving the Minneapolis-Saint Paul area of Minnesota, United States, that broadcasts a country music format  It is licensed to suburban Elk River, Minnesota and serves the Twin Cities as a rimshot signal. BOB-FM's 106.1 transmitter is in Albertville, Minnesota and its studios are in Ramsey, Minnesota.

BOB-FM's playlist focuses on a wide variety of country music. The station has a playlist of country music mainly focusing on the 1980s & 1990s, with some newer country music sprinkled in. KLCI brands itself as "TOTAL Country BOB-FM."

The station's nickname, "BOB-FM", came from a former Twin Cities country station, BOB 100, which changed formats in 1997 to an all-rock format with Howard Stern in the Morning. KLCI picked up the nickname and referred to itself as "The New BOB". The station was previously known as Q-106 (WQPM-FM), with the same country format.

In 1992 WQPM-FM changed frequencies with a flick of a switch from 106.3 to 106.1 and went from a 3 kilowatt to a 5 kilowatt signal off of the KXLI Tower (now KPXM Tower) and the first song played on 106.1 was the 1992 number one hit single There Ain’t Nothing Wrong With The Radio by Aaron Tippin. The 5 kilowatt signal got upgraded to 9.1 kilowatts when its facilities moved from Big Lake to Elk River.

In 2007, BOB 106 signed the long-time Twin Cities morning duo of Chuck & Jon (Chuck Knapp and Jon Engen) who had been the number-two morning show in the Twin Cities area at KTIS-FM.

Chuck Knapp retired in 2013, replaced by Neil Freeman who continued the Morning Show with Jon Engen. Jon Engen left the Morning Show in October 2014.  Jim Erickson and Neil Freemen now host the morning show.

Jim Erickson also hosts the All Request Show at Noon each day.  Geoff Jones is the midday host. Kirby Hemmesch hosts the afternoon drive.

Since 2006, BOB-FM has been flagship station of Minnesota Lynx.

BOB-FM programming can be heard on KLCI/106.1; KDDG/105.5 in Albany/St.Cloud, Minnesota; and KBGY/107.5 in Faribault, Minnesota (covering Southern Minnesota).

External links
BOB FM Website
BOB FM Business facing website

Twin Cities Radio Airchecks.com for old Aircheck recordings of Chuck Knapp

Radio stations in Minnesota
Classic country radio stations in the United States
Bob FM stations
Radio stations established in 1974